Erol Bekir, formerly known as Erol Bekirovski, (born 25 January 1974) is a Turkish-Swedish football manager and former player of Turkish origin with roots from Macedonia.

Playing career

Club
He started out playing for his hometown club Malmö FF in Sweden but spent most of his career playing abroad for clubs like BSC Young Boys, FC Lugano, Reggiana, FC Thun and SV Waldhof Mannheim.

Managerial career
Upon returning to Sweden he signed with lower division Malmö club IF Limhamn Bunkeflo where he also became player manager before retiring as a player and focusing only on the manager part at the end of 2009. In August 2012, IF Limhamn Bunkeflo and Bekir went their separate ways after the club announced that they could not match Bekirs level of ambition.

References

External links 
 
 German career stats - FuPa

1974 births
Living people
Macedonian people of Turkish descent
Macedonian Turks
Turkish people of Macedonian descent
Swedish people of Turkish descent
Swedish people of Macedonian descent
Association football midfielders
Swedish footballers
Macedonian footballers
Malmö FF players
BSC Young Boys players
FC Lugano players
Reggina 1914 players
FC Thun players
SV Waldhof Mannheim players
IF Limhamn Bunkeflo (men) players
Allsvenskan players
Swiss Super League players
Swiss Challenge League players
Serie C players
Superettan players
2. Bundesliga players
Swedish expatriate footballers
Expatriate footballers in Switzerland
Swedish expatriate sportspeople in Switzerland
Expatriate footballers in Italy
Swedish expatriate sportspeople in Italy
Expatriate footballers in Germany
Swedish expatriate sportspeople in Germany